Marie Prins (born 1948, married name Marie Jordaan) is a South African botanist.

Education and career 
Prins graduated from the University of Stellenbosch with a BSc in Botany. She completed her BSc(Hons) and MSc at the University of Pretoria. She obtained a PhD in botany with a thesis on Spikethorns of the world (Gymnosporia, Celastraceae). She was also involved in the development of a website containing information on South African trees aimed at both amateurs and scientists.

She assisted the authors with research for the book "Trees and Shrubs of Mpumalanga and The Kruger Park", published in 2002. She also corrected instances in the book where a plant had previously been described as a new variety and was later reclassified as a new species.

She worked at the South African National Biodiversity Institute and in 1999, she was listed as a Scientific officer for the National Herbarium involved in plant identification services and curation of the collection of flora, with special interest trees of southern Africa.

Research and workshops 
One study that Prins was involved in included 14 of the 17 genera accepted in the family Combretaceae, including 101 species and subspecies, in an effort to determine phylogenetic relationships. Samples were collected from field trips to:
South Africa (Limpopo, Mpumalanga, Gauteng, KwaZulu-Natal provinces)
Botswana 
Mozambique 
Namibia
Zimbabwe 

Cultivated samples were also included from 
Lowveld National Botanical Garden (Nelspruit, South Africa)
Pretoria National Botanical Garden (Pretoria, South Africa)
Kirstenbosch National Botanical Garden (Cape Town, South Africa)
National Botanic Garden, Harare (Zimbabwe)
Honolulu Botanical Gardens  
Missouri Botanical Garden
Royal Botanic Gardens, Kew

From 2008, Prins was involved in the annual summer-rainfall four-day workshop of the SANBI at Umtamvuna Nature Reserve, KwaZulu-Natal. She presented a Gymnosporia identification course for CREW (Custodians of Rare and Endangered Wildflowers) volunteers, students and members of the provincial conservation agencies.

In 2018 the Botanical Society of South Africa awarded Prins funding for "a taxonomic revision of part of the genus Olea". Taxonomy provides critical basic information to other branches of Botany (including conservation, environmental management and education) but is considered one of the least desirable parts of Botany and hence funding is difficult to obtain. The genus Olea had last been revised in 1963.

Selected publications 
 

Prins has published extensively in the following journals: 
 Bothalia - African Biodiversity and Conservation
 South African Journal of Botany
 Phytotaxa
 Taxon
 Kew Bulletin

References 

Living people
1948 births
20th-century South African botanists
Place of birth missing (living people)
20th-century South African women scientists
21st-century South African botanists
South African women botanists
21st-century South African women scientists